Sicotte is a surname. Notable people with the surname include:
 Anne-Marie Sicotte (born 1962), Canadian writer
 Antoine Sicotte, member of the Canadian band Sky
 Gilbert Sicotte (born 1948), Canadian actor
 Louis-Victor Sicotte (1812–1889), Canadian lawyer, judge and politician